Provincial Road 243 (PR 243) is an east-west provincial road in the extreme south-central region of the Canadian province of Manitoba. It runs from PTH 75 near Emerson to PTH 32 near Reinland. Along the route, it passes north of Gretna using a small concurrence with PTH 30.

PR 243 is one of the southernmost east-west highways in the province, and travels in very close proximity to the Canada - US border. Together with portions of PTH 3 and PTH 32, PR 243 forms the Boundary Commission Trail heading west from Emerson to the Saskatchewan border.

PR 243 is paved between Gretna and its western terminus. The road is gravel between Gretna and Emerson.

References

External links 
Manitoba Official Map

243